This is a list of species of fauna (animals) that have been observed in Rivers State, Nigeria.

Invertebrates

Arachnids
 Zebra spider, Salticus scenicus
 Jumping spider, Phidippus clarus

Crustaceans
 African rainbow crab, Cardisoma armatum
 Atlantic blue crab, Callinectes sapidus
 Atlantic ghost crab, Ocypode quadrata
 Blue land crab, Cardisoma guanhumi

Insects

Blattodea
 Australian cockroach, Periplaneta australasiae

Coleoptera
 Blue milkweed beetle, Chrysochus cobaltinus
 Chinese tiger beetle, Cicindela chinensis

Diptera
 Common housefly, Musca domestica
 Common malaria mosquito, Anopheles quadrimaculatus
 Common oblique syrphid, Allograpta obliqua
 Flower fly, Toxomerus geminatus

Hemiptera
 Creeping water bugs, Ilyocoris cimicoides

Hymenoptera
 Acrobat ant, Crematogaster ashmeadi
 African army ant, Dorylus molestus

Lepidoptera
 Cabbage butterfly, Pieris brassicae
 Cinnabar moth, Tyria jacobaeae
 Common fig-tree blue, Myrina silenus
 Eyed tiger moth, Hypercompe scribonia
 Gypsy moth, Lymantria dispar
 Monarch butterfly, Danaus plexippus 
 Snout moth, Glyphodes canthusalis

Odonata
 Navy dropwing, Trithemis furva
 Orange-winged dropwing, Trithemis kirbyi
 Pacific spiketail, Cordulegaster dorsalis
 Tasmanian darner, Austroaeschna tasmanica

Orthoptera
 Fall field cricket, Gryllus pennsylvanicus

Molluscs
 Banana rasp snail, Archachatina marginata
 Giant African snail, Achatina fulica
 Giant tiger land snail, Achatina achatina

Vertebrates

Amphibians
 Crowned bullfrog, Hoplobatrachus occipitalis 
 Flat-backed toad, Amietophrynus maculatus
 Mascarene ridged frog, Ptychadena mascareniensis
 South African sharp-nosed frog, Ptychadena oxyrhynchus
 Square-marked toad, Amietophrynus regularis
 Western clawed frog, Xenopus tropicalis

Birds

Mammals
 African marsh rat, Dasymys incomtus
 African pygmy mouse, Mus minutoides 
 Big-eared swamp rat, Malacomys longipes
 Black rat, Rattus rattus
 Brown rat, Rattus norvegicus
 Forest giant squirrel, Protoxerus stangeri
 Gambian pouched rat, Cricetomys gambianus
 Giant forest hog, Hylochoerus meinertzhageni
 Green bush squirrel, Paraxerus poensis
 House rat, Mus musculus
 Mona monkey, Cercopithecus mona
 Pygmy hippopotamus, Hexaprotodon liberiensis 
 Red-bellied monkey, Cercopithecus erythrogaster
 Red colobus monkey, Procolobus preussi
 Sclater's monkey, Cercopithecus sclateri
 Striped ground squirrel, Xerus erythropus
 Typical striped grass mouse, Lemniscomys striatus
 Yellow-backed duiker, Cephalophus silvicultor

Reptiles
 African rock python, Python sebae
 Ball python, Python regius
 Black-necked spitting cobra, Naja nigricollis
 Blue-bellied black snake, Pseudechis guttatus 
 Brown Rat Snake, Zaocys fuscus
 Calabar python, Calabaria reinhardtii
 Common house gecko, Hemidactylus frenatus
 Dwarf crocodile, Osteolaemus tetraspis
 Emerald snake, Hapsidophrys smaragdina
 Fire skink, Lepidothyris fernandi
 Forest cobra, Naja melanoleuca
 Forest hinge-back tortoise, Kinixys erosa
 Forest vine snake, Thelotornis kirtlandii
 Gaboon viper, Bitis gabonica
 Green bush viper, Atheris squamigera
 Jameson's mamba, Dendroaspis jamesoni
 Nile crocodile, Crocodylus niloticus
 Ornate monitor, Varanus ornatus
 Rainbow agama, Agama agama
 Senegal mabuya, Trachylepis affinis
 Slender-snouted crocodile, Mecistops cataphractus
 Speckle-lipped skink, Trachylepis maculilabris
 West African black turtle, Pelusios niger
 West African night adder, Causus maculatus

References